Rokytnice nad Rokytnou is a market town in Třebíč District in the Vysočina Region of the Czech Republic. It has about 800 inhabitants.

References

Populated places in Třebíč District
Market towns in the Czech Republic